The Belize–Guatemala border is an almost straight line  long, close to the 89th meridian west, which separates the west of Belize's territory from Guatemala's.

Border description and history

The border between Belize and Guatemala is defined in Article I of the Wyke–Aycinena Treaty of 1859:

The border has been disputed by Guatemala, which claims that the treaty is void since Britain failed to comply with economic assistance provisions found in Article VII. The situation was partially resolved in 1991 when Guatemala officially recognized Belize's independence and diplomatic relations were established.

Border communities and crossings

There is one main highway crossing of the border, at Benque Viejo del Carmen, Cayo District, Belize and Melchor de Mencos, Peten, Guatemala, where Guatemala Highway CA-13 meets the George Price (Western) Highway, connecting to Belize City and Belmopan. 

About four kilometers south of this crossing is the village of Arenal, which has homes on both sides of the border, and a football field directly on the border.  From the Guatemala side, there is just a footbridge to a road into Melchor de Mencos; the Belize side has a road connecting to Benque Viejo.

See also 
 Belize–Guatemala relations
 Belizean–Guatemalan territorial dispute
 Belize–Mexico border

References 

 
Borders of Belize
Borders of Guatemala
International borders